Sinuiju Chongnyon station, also known as Sinŭiju Ch'ŏngnyŏn station, is a railway station in Yŏkchŏn-dong, Sinŭiju-si, North P'yŏngan Province, North Korea. It is the northern terminus of the P'yŏngŭi Line of the Korean State Railway, and the starting point of the Kang'an Line, which is an industrial line serving the factories of Sinŭiju. 

The station is the main recipient for overland traffic between North Korea and the People's Republic of China, and is one of the country's most important rail stations, as it controls access to the Chinese city of Dandong over the Yalu River, via the Sino-Korean Friendship Bridge. Adjacent to the station is a locomotive maintenance depot.

History
The Kyŏngŭi Line was opened on 3 April 1906, and general passenger and freight service began on 1 April 1908. The original station was located at what is now Kang'an station,  to the northwest of the current Sinŭiju Ch'ŏngnyŏn station, but, following the opening of the Yalu River Bridge connecting the Kyŏngŭi Line to the South Manchuria Railway's Shendan (Anpo) Line, the Chosen Government Railway opened a new station at the current site. 

The old station was then renamed Lower Sinŭiju station. On 1 June 1936, Lower Sinŭiju station was renamed Sinŭiju Kang'an station, and the  line from Sinŭiju station to Sinŭiju Kang'an station was detached from the Kyŏngŭi Line to become the Kang'an Line. Passenger service on the Kang'an Line was discontinued on 31 March 1943, with general (public) freight traffic being relocated from Sinŭiju Kang'an to Sinŭiju station on 20 December of that year.

The original three-story European style building was destroyed by UN forces in the Korean War, and the station was rebuilt after the war; it received the current name at the same time, in honour of the Youth Shock Troops who took part in the reconstruction of the station.

Gallery

References

Sinuiju
Railway stations in North Korea
Railway stations opened in 1911